Undisputed II: Last Man Standing is a 2006 American direct-to-video martial arts film directed by Isaac Florentine and starring Michael Jai White, Scott Adkins, Eli Danker and Ben Cross. It is the sequel to the 2002 boxing film Undisputed. White portrays ex-boxer George "Iceman" Chambers, a role originally played by Ving Rhames in the first film. It was followed by two sequels: Undisputed III: Redemption (2010) and Boyka: Undisputed (2017), which continue the story of Russian prison fighter Yuri Boyka, played by Adkins.

Plot
Some years after fighting Monroe "Undisputed" Hutchen in prison, former boxing champion George "Iceman" Chambers visits the Russian Federation for a series of boxing matches, where he is subsequently framed for possession of cocaine and once again sent to prison. There, he discovers a series of illegal mixed martial arts matches dominated by inmate Yuri Boyka. The prison officials arrange these fights and place large side-bets to make a personal profit, often at the expense of the fighters. Chambers shares a cell with Steven Parker, a British junkie.

Mob boss Gaga and Warden Markov tell Chambers that if he fights Boyka, he will likely get an expedited appeal and early release. Chambers initially refuses, but after spending time in demeaning physical labor in the prison's sewer system and experiencing firsthand the brutality of the guards, he reluctantly agrees. He is rescued from both forms of humiliation by an inmate named Crot, who uses a wheelchair. Both fighters train hard for the match, though Chambers still relies on his boxing background while Boyka prepares a series of deadly kicks, throws, and grappling combinations designed to humiliate his opponent in the ring. Prior to the fight however, Boyka's gang force Steven, who is acting as Chambers' cornerman, to spike his water with a light sedative during the fight.

During the fight, Chambers is somewhat taken by surprise at the flurry and variety of Boyka's attacks, but manages to hold his own through the first round by keeping his distance, staying calm, and dealing out painful punching combinations whenever possible. At the end of the first round, Chambers takes a few sips of the spiked water, causing him to lose on the second round when he loses consciousness and falls to Boyka's flying kick. Following the match, Steven hangs himself out of guilt. Later, Chambers confronts Boyka over the sedative incident; after Boyka learns that his gang spiked Chambers' water behind his back, Chambers demands a rematch to ensure his release. Chambers receives training in mixed martial arts from Crot, who was a former soldier and the one who trained Boyka in his fighting style.

Once the rematch begins, it is apparent to all the viewers that the combatants are evenly matched and Chambers is more impressive in his style. The fight is long and intense, with flurries of combinations, grapples, and throws traded between the two. Eventually, Chambers realizes that Boyka will not lose consciousness, will not submit, and will likely knock him out if the fight goes on too long. Chambers alters his strategy and manages to get Boyka in a joint lock and ends the fight by breaking Boyka's leg, proving that he is the undisputed new champion of the prison. Shortly thereafter, Chambers is released from prison and uses his winnings to buy Crot's freedom as well. In a final scene, he wheels Crot to a train station to meet with his estranged niece in a happy reunion. Crot thanks Chambers for giving him the remainder of the winnings to start his life again, while Chambers expresses his gratitude for the help and training. Crot then meets with his long lost niece and the two embrace.

Cast

Music

Soundtracks
1. "The Eyewitness of the World Had To See" Performed by Male Choir of Valaam Conducted by Igor Ushakov Courtesy of 5 Alarm Music. 
2. "Mi Smo Za Lovu" (We In The Money) Written by Dekembe Tutu Poku and Nathaniel Dawkins Translated, adapted and performed by Aleksandar Sasha Panich Published by Engine Co 35/Source in Sync Music (ASCAP) 
courtesy of 5 Alarm Music.
3. "Runnin'" Written by Tom Erba and Nathaniel Dawkins Performed by Nathaniel Dawkins Published by Engine Co 30/Sync Source Music (BMI) Engine Co 35/Source in Sync Music (ASCAP) Courtesy of 5 Alarm Music.
4. "Cocktail Lullaby" Written and Performed by Stephen Edwards Published by Engine Co 35/Source in Sync Music (ASCAP) Courtesy of 5 Alarm Music.
5. "Drug Dealer" Written by Mike Mutantoff Performed by Mike Mutantoff and the Killektive Published by Killective records (ASCAP) Courtesy of NOMA Music. 
6. "Krush You" Written by Tom Erba Published by Engine Co 30/Sync Source Music (BMI) Courtesy of 5 Alarm Music. 
7. "Till I Die" Written by Tom Erba and Nathaniel Dawkins Performed by Nathaniel Dawkins Published by Engine Co 30/Sync Source Music (BMI) Engine Co 35/Source in Sync Music (ASCAP) Courtesy of 5 Alarm Music. 
8. "Adrenaline Junkie" Written by Dalibor Andonov (as Dalibor Andonov Gru) Performed by Gru Published by SOKOJ (BMI) Courtesy of Centroscena. 
9. "Bring It On" Written by Tom Erba and Nathaniel Dawkins Performed by Nathaniel Dawkins Published by Engine Co 30/Sync Source Music (BMI) Engine Co 35/Source in Sync Music (ASCAP) Courtesy of 5 Alarm Music.

Reception

Critical response
Mark Pollard of Kung Fu Cinema gave Undisputed II: Last Man Standing four out of five stars, calling it "the first great martial arts movie of 2007 and Isaac Florentine’s best to date."

Sequel

A sequel titled Undisputed III: Redemption, was released in 2010.

References

External links
 
 
 

2006 direct-to-video films
2006 action films
American independent films
American martial arts films
American prison films
2000s sports films
American boxing films
Direct-to-video sequel films
Films about suicide
Films directed by Isaac Florentine
Films set in Moscow
Films set in Russia
Films set in Saint Petersburg
Films shot in Bulgaria
Martial arts tournament films
Mixed martial arts films
Underground fighting films
2006 martial arts films
2006 films
Undisputed (film series)
2000s English-language films
Films produced by Boaz Davidson
Films with screenplays by Boaz Davidson
2000s American films